Henry Duncan may refer to:
Henry Duncan (minister) (1774–1846), Scottish minister, geologist and social reformer; founder of the savings bank movement
Henry Duncan (naval officer, born 1735) (1735–1814), Naval captain and Deputy Comptroller of the Royal Navy
Sir Henry Duncan (naval officer, born 1786) (1786–1835), Scottish sailor

See also
 
 James Henry Duncan (disambiguation)